Enrique González Rojo may refer to:

 Enrique González Rojo, Sr. (1899–1939), Mexican writer and father of the below
 Enrique González Rojo, Jr. (1928–2021), Mexican writer and son of the above